Ommatobotys aldabralis is a moth in the family Crambidae. It was described by Viette in 1958. It is found on the Seychelles (Aldabra, Assomption).

References

Moths described in 1958
Spilomelinae